Asian Tigers may refer to:

 Four Asian Tigers, an economic group comprising Hong Kong, Singapore, South Korea, and Taiwan
 Asian Tigers (militant group), a Pakistani organization